Jeannette Faber (born April 28, 1982) is an American long-distance runner. She competed in the marathon event at the 2013 World Championships in Athletics in Moscow, Russia where she placed 23rd in 2:44:03. Faber qualified for the 2016 Olympic Marathon Trials at 2013 California International Marathon. She has won eight marathons.

References

External links
 
 
 Jeannette Faber at Newton Running Elite

1982 births
Living people
American female long-distance runners
American female marathon runners
World Athletics Championships athletes for the United States
Sportspeople from Lansing, Michigan
Grand Valley State University alumni
21st-century American women